Elba Lightfoot (1910-1989) was an African-American artist known for her work on the Works Progress Administration (WPA) murals at Harlem Hospital.

She was born in Evanston, Illinois. In 1935, together with Charles Alston, Augusta Savage (who had experienced discrimination in her artistic career), others artists and bibliophile Arthur Schomburg, Lightfoot founded the Harlem Artists Guild to work towards equality in WPA art programs in New York. In 1936, a group of African American artists, including Charles Alston, Georgette Seabrook, Vertis Hayes, Sara Murrell, Selma Day, and Lightfoot submitted mural designs for Harlem Hospital in New York City. The murals were approved by the WPA's Federal Art Project (FPA), but the hospital superintendent, L.T. Dermody, initially rejected four of the designs. She was among the artists who took part in the Exhibition of the Art of the American Negro (1851-1940) (July 4–September 2, 1940), connected with the American Negro Exposition, at the Tanner Art Galleries in Chicago. She also featured in American Negro Art, 19th and 20th Centuries (December 9, 1941 – January 3, 1942) at New York's Downtown Gallery, the first exhibition of African-American art to have been held at a mainstream commercial gallery; curated by Edith Halpert, owner of the gallery, the exhibition counted among its sponsored such prominent white patrons as Mayor Fiorello La Guardia, Archibald MacLeish, A. Philip Randolph, and Eleanor Roosevelt.

Elba Lightfoot appears in a group photograph of the artists of the WPA Art Center at 306 W. 141st St., New York.

A 1988 oral history interview of Elba Lightfoot is in the Camille Billops and James V. Hatch Archives at Emory University.

References

External links
Toy Parade by Elba Lightfoot

1910 births
Year of death missing
African-American painters
American muralists
American women painters
Artists from New York City
Harlem Renaissance
People from Harlem
Federal Art Project artists
Women muralists
20th-century African-American people
20th-century African-American women